Bitten is a 2008 Canadian black comedy vampire film directed by Harv Glazer.  It stars Jason Mewes as a paramedic who rescues Danika (Erica Cox), a female vampire, from an alley way.

Plot
Jack, a paramedic, is frustrated with his life after he breaks up with his girlfriend.  He discovers a girl (Danika) in an alleyway covered in blood, clinging to life. Jack takes Danika in and soon discovers that she is a vampire.

Jack and Danika try to find a way to feed her cravings to drink blood while killing as little as possible.  All their attempts end without success because a vampire needs fresh human blood. Jack also must find places to hide the bodies in his apartment, including the body of his ex-girlfriend, who had gone to his apartment to reclaim several of her possessions before Danika had bitten and killed her. Jack discovers upon his ex-girlfriend's corpse reanimating into a vampire (and having to kill her when she attacks him in a rage) that only a stab to the heart will kill a vampire.

When Danika becomes more violent, killing several people, including a young woman, Jack is forced to kill her with the help of Roger, his paramedic co-worker and friend. Roger stabs Danika in the heart while she attacks Jack and kills her, but not before Jack is bitten. Jack becomes a vampire, cared for by Roger, who feeds him from a dish of blood.

Cast

Release
It aired on Sci Fi Channel on March 15, 2009. RHI Entertainment released it on DVD on July 6, 2010.

Reception
Mark Voger of NJ.com recommended it to fans of Mewes and said that the film, despite its "considerable flaws", is better than many competitors.  R.L. Shaffer of IGN rated it 3/10 stars and wrote, "Bitten had tremendous potential to be pretty darn amusing, but it fails on nearly every conceivable level."  Steve Barton of Dread Central rated it 2.5/5 stars and wrote that the film's tone is ruined by out-of-place slapstick.  Annie Riordan of Brutal as Hell wrote that the film remains entertaining despite its lack of originality.  Jeremy Blitz of DVD Talk rated it 2.5/5 stars and wrote, "The humor and the horror counteract rather than reinforce each other."

References

External links

2008 films
2008 comedy horror films
Canadian comedy horror films
English-language Canadian films
Vampire comedy films
Canadian vampire films
2000s English-language films
2000s Canadian films